The 1892 Baltimore Orioles season was the first season that the professional baseball team known as the Baltimore Orioles competed in the National League, following the demise of the American Association. In a split season schedule, the Orioles finished last in the first half of the season and 10th in the second half. Overall, the team had a record of 46–101, worst in the 12-team National League. Note that the 19th-century Orioles franchise is not the Baltimore Orioles franchise that has competed in the American League since 1954.

Regular season

Season standings

Record vs. opponents

Roster

Player stats

Batting

Starters by position 
Note: Pos = Position; G = Games played; AB = At bats; H = Hits; Avg. = Batting average; HR = Home runs; RBI = Runs batted in

Other batters 
Note: G = Games played; AB = At bats; H = Hits; Avg. = Batting average; HR = Home runs; RBI = Runs batted in

Pitching

Starting pitchers 
Note: G = Games pitched; IP = Innings pitched; W = Wins; L = Losses; ERA = Earned run average; SO = Strikeouts

Other pitchers 
Note: G = Games pitched; IP = Innings pitched; W = Wins; L = Losses; ERA = Earned run average; SO = Strikeouts

Relief pitchers 
Note: G = Games pitched; W = Wins; L = Losses; SV = Saves; ERA = Earned run average; SO = Strikeouts

References

External links 
1892 Baltimore Orioles season at Baseball-Reference.com
1892 Baltimore Orioles season at Baseball Almanac

Baltimore Orioles (1882–1899) seasons
Baltimore Orioles season
Baltimore Orio